Aboitiz Power Corporation also known as AboitizPower (AP), a subsidiary of Aboitiz Equity Ventures (AEV), is a holding company engaged in power distribution, generation and retail electricity services.

Background 
Aboitiz Power Corporation was established on February 13, 1998. The company is AEV's largest subsidiary, contributing 71% of its total income in the first three months of 2019, and holds all of its assets in generation and distribution of electricity. The company's power generation unit is engaged in operations of solar, coal, oil, hydroelectric, and geothermal facilities.

On July 16, 2007, it became a publicly-listed company on the Philippine Stock Exchange with an initial public offering of 1.8 billion shares out of 7.2 billion registered common shares.

The company established the SN Aboitiz Power (SNAP), a joint venture with Norway-based company SN Power Invest AS, in 2005 with the goal of producing renewable energy. It introduced the floating solar farm, the method of putting solar panels on a body of water to lessen land use, in Tawi-tawi and Magat Dam in Isabela.

In April 2019, the Philippine Competition Commission (PCC), Energy Regulatory Commission, and the Senate Committee on Energy conducted separate probes on a series of power outages in Luzon that were said to be caused by alleged collusion among power firms as a way to increase electricity prices. Power companies denied the claim, and Aboitiz Power Corporation stated that the said outages were "bad for business" and they were open to any investigation. According to the Department of Energy, the outages were due to technical issues caused by old and new power plants, maintenance shutdown, and reduction of power rating of some facilities.

Subsidiaries 
The company's subsidiaries include Aboitiz Energy Solutions Inc., Davao Light & Power Co. Inc., Cotabato Light & Power Co., Hijos de F. Escaño, Inc., Pampanga Energy Ventures Inc., San Fernando Electric Light and Power Co., Subic Enerzone Corp., and Visayan Electric Co., Inc.

References 

Companies listed on the Philippine Stock Exchange
Electric power companies of the Philippines
Energy companies established in 1998
1998 establishments in the Philippines